VeggieTales in the City is an American computer-animated children's comedy streaming television series produced by Big Idea Entertainment. The series is a sequel to VeggieTales in the House. It premiered on Netflix on February 24, 2017 with the release of 13 episodes. A second season was released on September 15, 2017.

Cast

Main
Bob the Tomato (voiced by Phil Vischer) – One of the main characters of VeggieTales, he is best friends and roommates with Larry the Cucumber. He works part-time at Pa Grape's store doing various jobs and tasks. He enjoys doing things like reading, studying the weather with his weather machine, and helping out his friends in the city. 
Larry the Cucumber (voiced by Mike Nawrocki) – Best friends and roommates with Bob the Tomato, Larry is scatterbrained and has an energetic, childlike personality. He enjoys doing very silly things, like singing silly songs, eating large amounts of sardines, and riding his bicycle on the ceiling. He works driving the town's ice-cream cart and does odd jobs at Pa Grape's store. He secretly protects the city from crime as the superhero LarryBoy, making use of a LarryMobile and a secret lair underneath the apartment he shares with Bob.
Laura Carrot (voiced by Tress MacNeille) – A young carrot girl who is friends with Bob and Larry and Junior Asparagus, her best friend. She loves playing with her friends, including baseball and jump rope. She eventually gained a superheroine alter ego dubbed "Night Pony", where she helps fight crime with LarryBoy and the other super heroes of the house.
Junior Asparagus (voiced by Tress MacNeille) – Best friends with Laura, Junior is a typical child and looks up to Larry. Like Larry, he also has a superhero altermego, "Junior Jetpack," using a jet pack given to him by Ichabeezer. Junior is often a superhero duo with LarryBoy.
Archibald Asparagus (voiced by Phil Vischer) – The Mayor of the town with an upper crust British accent. He enjoys being the mayor and leader of the city, but more often than not, he can be overwhelmed by the amount of work he does. He often acts as a judge/impartial third party whenever something is wrong.

Recurring
Pa Grape (voiced by Phil Vischer) – A wise old grape, he runs a convenience store called Pa's Corner Store. He often provides wise and insightful advice to his friends and customers. He now has eyes.
Jimmy and Jerry Gourd (voiced by Phil Vischer and Mike Nawrocki) - Brothers that live together in an apartment not far from Bob and Larry's house. They don't do much, but they love to eat and spend time with their pet dust bunny Danny, and their other pet guppy named Happy Sunshine Bubbles. Jimmy also gained a superhero alter ego by the name of JimmyBoy, where LarryBoy has taken Jimmy under his wing and  trained him to be a superhero. 
Petunia Rhubarb (voiced by Tress MacNeille) – Good friends with Bob, Larry, and Tina Celerina. She often enjoys hanging out with them and often offers them advice whenever they get into a fight or face personal problems. She worked part-time at Pa Grape's store, but followed her love of plants and has opened a flower shop. 
Ichabeezer (voiced by Rob Paulsen) – Ichabeezer is a grumpy, gruff and elderly zucchini. He doesn't like or get along very well with the other veggies, especially when they get on his lawn. They only thing Ichabeezer truly likes is his beloved pet olive dog, Rooney. For the Netflix era, he has essentially assumed Mr. Nezzer's role as an outsider/villain foil for Bob and Larry. His home is a large mansion built out of the side of a couch. 
Jean-Claude and Phillipe Pea (Voiced by Mike Nawrocki and Phil Vischer) – The brothers, Jean-Claude and Phillipe, are peas with French accents. The brothers appear to be school aged and presumably live together while their father lives in France.
Madame Blueberry (voiced by Tress MacNeille) – A female blueberry with a slight British accent. She lives in a blue, teapot shaped house, where she spends most of her time drinking tea and enjoying the "fancier" things in life. She has been known to win various contests and events around town such as karaoke and pie baking. She has an especially lovely singing-voice and has a specialty for singing "the blues." 
Mr. Lunt (voiced by Phil Vischer) – A Hispanic gourd, he works around the city and sells various items, often joking that his job changes every episode. He eventually set up his own place of business, where he can be seen doing his various odd jobs. Carrying on from the original videos, his lack of eyes is a running gag throughout the show.
Bacon Bill (voiced by Rob Paulsen) – An eccentric genius who is the son of one of Pa Grape's friends. He looks up to Larry as an older brother figure. He is very wacky, and can often be seen doing various silly things, mostly on Ichabeezer's lawn. 
Tina Celerina (voiced by Tress MacNeille) – Petunia's best friend and employee of her flower shop. She is very scatterbrained and quirky, which can get her into trouble. Despite this, she has a very positive attitude and an outgoing personality. 
Motato (voiced by Rob Paulsen) – An evil Sweet Potato who is LarryBoy's chief nemesis. He is quite insane and enjoys wreaking havoc and chaos on the veggie citizens of the house. Along with his radish minions, he carries out various nefarious plots to destroy the city. His evil lair is located in his bathroom. In “Attack of the Marshmallow Laser”, he has reformed to a good guy and became part of the League of Veggies.
Aprilcot (voiced by Tress MacNeille) - An apricot supervillian; Motato's former partner-in-crime.

Episodes

Season 1 (2017)

Season 2 (2017)

References

External links

2010s American animated television series
2010s American children's comedy television series
Big Idea Entertainment television series
Television series by DreamWorks Animation
2017 American television series debuts
2017 American television series endings
2017 animated television series debuts
American children's animated comedy television series
American children's animated education television series
American children's animated fantasy television series
American computer-animated television series
American sequel television series
Christian children's television series
Christian animation
Netflix children's programming
VeggieTales
English-language Netflix original programming
Television series created by Doug TenNapel